Dinko Atanasov (born 18 September 1938) is a Bulgarian volleyball player. He competed in the men's tournament at the 1968 Summer Olympics.

References

1938 births
Living people
Bulgarian men's volleyball players
Olympic volleyball players of Bulgaria
Volleyball players at the 1968 Summer Olympics
Sportspeople from Sliven